The Honda FR-V, marketed as the Honda Edix in Japan, is a six-passenger car that was manufactured by Honda from 2004-2009 (with marketing ending in 2011 in some regions), over a single generation. A five-door compact multi-purpose vehicle (MPV), the FR-V was noted for its 3+3 seating configuration, along with the Fiat Multipla.

It has been claimed that FR-V stands for Flexible Recreation Vehicle, although Honda did not officially state this.

The FR-V was officially launched in Europe in Autumn 2004. It shares a similar platform to the Honda CR-V (which in turn shares a similar platform to the Honda Civic), but with a longer wheelbase. The FR-V allows folding down the front middle seat to create a tray or arm rest. The compact MPV offers 32 different seating combinations in addition to three ISOFIX points.

The front suspension is a MacPherson strut, with the rear being Double wishbone suspension.

In 2007, the FR-V received its first and only facelift, where Honda changed the front bumper, headlights, tail lights and door handles. On the inside, the carbon-fibre look trim was removed, leaving only wood-trims (available pre-facelift). An aux-in port was added for the infotainment system. At a similar time, the 2.2 i-CTDi Diesel engine was added.

In August 2009, the FR-V ended production without a direct successor.

Engines
The FR-V was available with four petrol (both Japan and Europe used the K20, with slight differences) and one diesel powered engine, though this depended on the region.

Information regarding 1.8 i-VTEC and 2.2 i-CTDi from Honda UK Brochure. 1.7 VTEC, 2.0 i-VTEC (6-speed) and some 2.2 i-CTDi information sourced from Honda News Europe. Information regarding Japan region and 2.0 i-VTEC (5-speed) from Autozine. Further information regarding Japan region, 2.0 i-VTEC (5-speed auto) and 4-speed auto from Greenwise. Extra information for all Japan models found from TCV. Extra information for all European models found from Parkers.

The 1.7 VTEC and 2.0 i-VTEC were replaced in the spring of 2007 by a new 1.8 i-VTEC from the eighth generation Honda Civic. The Japanese-market version (known as the Honda Edix) kept the 2.0 i-VTEC engine, and a 2.4 i-VTEC engine was added. At the same time, some minor cosmetic changes were made (carbon effect interior, light cluster, and darker front grill). All-wheel drive was also offered for vehicles sold in Japan.

References

External links
Honda FR-V UK Model Information

FR-V
Compact MPVs
Euro NCAP small MPVs
Cars introduced in 2004
Front-wheel-drive vehicles